SM Estates (formerly SM Lifestyle Cities), are integrated mixed-used developments of SM Prime Holdings. The Estates combine elements of SM Prime's core segments such shopping malls, residential development, commercial development, hotels and conventions, and leisure areas and resorts. SM Prime plans to develop more "estates" similar to the 60-hectare Mall of Asia Complex in Pasay which will optimize land where premiere malls currently stand. Subsequent Estates are planned for SM City Clark in Angeles City, SM North EDSA, SM Lanang Premier in Davao, SM Southmall and in its rising development SM Seaside.

As of 2019-end, SM Prime has 10 integrated property developments in Metro Manila and 11 in key provincial cities.

Branches
These SM Estates have shopping malls as their initial and main anchor development. Malls in lifestyle cities are among the biggest in their respective regions and include residential and office spaces, hotels and convention centers.

Metro Manila

Luzon

Visayas

Mindanao

References

Mixed-use developments in the Philippines
SM Prime